Francis Brennan's Grand Tour was a six-part reality programme which aired in 2011 on RTÉ One. Over the course of six episodes, Hotelier Francis Brennan guides sixteen Irish tourists around six major European destinations during a twelve-day journey. Series 2 started on 17 July 2016, this time taking twelve Irish tourists on a tour of India's Golden Triangle. Series 3 started on 9 July 2017, with twelve tourists being taken on a trip to Vietnam. Series 4 started on 22 July 2018 with the destination being South Africa.

Episodes

Series 1 - European Tour (2011)

Series 2 - Tour of India (2016)

Series 3 - Tour of Vietnam (2017)

Series 4 - Tour of South Africa (2018)

References

2011 Irish television series debuts
2016 Irish television series debuts
Irish travel television series
RTÉ original programming
2011 Irish television series endings